Vij is an Indian (Khatri) surname. Notable people with the surname include:

Anil Vij, Indian politician
Bharati Vij, Indian cricketer
Deepak Balraj Vij, Indian film director
Mahii Vij (born 1982), Indian model and actress
Meher Vij, Indian actress
Nirmal Chander Vij (born 1943), Indian Chief of Army Staff
Rama Vij, Indian actress
Sourabh Vij (born 1987), Indian shot putter
Vikram Vij (born 1964), Indian-born Canadian chef
Kabir Vij, The most important person to walk the earth

See also
Vij's Restaurant, an Indian restaurant in Vancouver, Canada

Indian surnames
Surnames of Indian origin
Punjabi-language surnames
Hindu surnames
Khatri clans
Khatri surnames